The Kissi people, are a West African ethnolinguistic group. They are the fourth largest ethnic group in Guinea, making up 6.2% of the population. Kissi people are also found in Liberia and Sierra Leone. They speak the Kissi language, which belongs to the Mel branch of the Niger–Congo language family. The Kissi are well known for making baskets and weaving on vertical looms.  In past times they were also famous for their ironworking skills, as the country and its neighbors possess rich deposits of iron. Kissi smiths produced the famous "Kissi penny,"

The Kissi people are also called Assi, Bakoa, Den, Gihi, Gisi, Gissi, Gizi, Kisi, Kisia, Kisie, Kisiye, Kizi, or Kalen

History 
According to The Peoples of Africa, Kissi tradition considers that before the seventeenth century they inhabited the Upper Niger region. Supposedly they lived south of the Futa Jallon until the Yalunka people expelled them. After 1600, they migrated westward, expelling the Limbas in their march, but were under constant threat from the Kurankos.

Resistance to French conquest by Kissi Kaba Keita
In Guinea, the Kissi warrior Kissi Kaba Keita managed to unite many Kissi chiefdoms under his reign and resist French conquest for many years. Before French attacks, he had rallied the Kurankos of Morige and the Leles of Yombiro. When the French arrived in 1892, he had to let the relatively autonomous chiefs of the respective areas defend themselves. Due to the French's technological superiority, Kissi Kaba resorted mainly to guerilla tactics, thus delaying their conquest of his kingdom. Still, by 1893 he realized that his resistance would fail and subjected himself to the French, who then recognized him as chief of the northern Kissi territory. However, his relationship with the French gradually worsened, which led to them appointing his rivals in a number of his chiefdoms, and eventually to his execution in Siguiri.

Economy
The Kissi are primarily farmers. Rice, their staple crop, is grown on most hillsides and in low, swampy areas. Other crops include peanuts, cotton, corn, bananas, potatoes, and melons. Beans, tomatoes, onions, and peppers are grown in small vegetable gardens, and coffee raised as a cash crop. Most of the farmers also raise some livestock.

Agricultural work, such as sowing, weeding, and harvesting, is shared equally by the men and women. Additional responsibilities for the men include hunting, fishing, and clearing land. The women's duties involve caring for the small vegetable gardens, tending to the chickens, trading in the local markets, and doing some fishing. Boys tend to livestock, which is usually cattle and goats. Cows are considered valuable animals, not for their milk, but as religious sacrifices.

Social systems

For many generations, Kissi are well known as hard-working people. They are very age-oriented, dominated and led by the chief and the elderly people. The Kissi live in small, self-governing villages that are tucked inside groves of mango or kola trees. Each village is compact, containing no more than about 150 people. Houses are usually raised slightly above the ground and are round with mud walls, cone-shaped thatch roofs, and verandahs. In the center of the village is a public square with a dwelling place for the village headman. He offers sacrifices at the village shrine and acts as judge over the community.

To the Kissi, a child is not considered "complete" and is thought of as dirty and impure. Therefore, when a boy or girl reaches puberty, a purification ritual is held. This ceremony, called a biriye, "cleanses" the child and ushers them into adulthood. Afterwards, the young adult is expected to take on adult responsibilities.

Music plays a unique role in the Kissi culture. Sometimes, it is used for certain types of communication. The music does not necessarily have a melody, but rather a rhythmic sound with much drumming and whistling.

Religion and spiritual beliefs
Although many Kissi have converted to Christianity, most of them continue to practice their traditional ethnic religion. Ancestor worship or praying to deceased relatives is a common practice among the Kissi. The Kissi believe that ancestral spirits act as mediators between them and the creator, god. Small stone statues are used to represent the spirits. They are worshipped and offered sacrifices by the village headmen. Many carved soapstone figures and heads were produced by the Kissi people in the past prior to colonial contact with the Europeans. It is not clear why they were made; some scholars argue that they form part of ancestor worship while others say they may represent gods to increase agricultural yields. A large number can be seen in the British Museum's collection.

Kissi Surnames

Notable Kissi people 
Joseph Boakai, former Vice President of Liberia from 2006 to 2018
Henri Camara, Senegalese footballer
Maxime Camara, Guinean footballer
Benjamin Feindouno, Guinean footballer
Pascal Feindouno, Guinean footballer
Simon Feindouno, Guinean footballer
Kai Abdul Foday, former Sierra Leonean politician
Aly Gilbert Iffono, Guinean author
Tamba Hali, Liberian and former defensive end for the Kansas City Chiefs
Elie Kamano, Guinean musician
Amiral Dakk Kamano, Guinean-reggae musician
François Kamano, Guinean footballer
Mohamed Kamanor, Sierra Leonean footballer
Victor Kantabadouno, Guinean footballer
Kissi Kaba Keita, a warrior who resisted French conquest from 1892 on.
Claude Kory Kondiano, Guinean politician 
Augustine Kortu, Sierra Leonean politician  
Sékou Koundouno, Guinean activist
Kai Londo, was a great Kissi warrior from Sierra Leone who conquered a large territory and ruled with wisdom in southern Sierra Leone.
Jean Paul Millimono, Guinean musician
Faya Lansana Millimouno, Guinean politician
Tamba Zacharie Millimouno, Guinean journalist
Tom Nyuma, a retired colonel in the Sierra Leonean Armed Forces, and the current council chairman of Kailahun District
Tamba Borbor-Sawyer, Sierra Leonean politician and a retired officer in the Sierra Leone Police.
Emmanuel Tolno, Guinean footballer
Sia Tolno, Guinean musician
Koumba Aviane Tonguino, Guinean musician

References

External links

For spirits and kings: African art from the Paul and Ruth Tishman collection, an exhibition catalog from The Metropolitan Museum of Art Libraries (fully available online as PDF), which contains material on the Kissi people
http://www.gateway-africa.com/tribe/Kissi_tribe.html

Ethnic groups in Guinea
Ethnic groups in Liberia
Ethnic groups in Sierra Leone
Female genital mutilation
Female genital mutilation by country